Pramod Khanna is an Indian actor and producer. He is the late Vinod Khanna's brother and uncle to Rahul Khanna and Akshaye Khanna. He has little appearance on screen although due to his resemblance to his brother, he was cast in Dabangg 3. He was the president of Indian Rugby Football Union too.

Biography
Khanna produced a Hindi film titled Farebi which was released in 1974. He played the role of "Prajapati Pandey", father of main protagonist "Chulbul Pandey" in Dabangg 3 which was earlier played by his brother Vinod Khanna in Dabangg and Dabangg 2 who died in 2017. "It sure feels good. Doing something which my late brother did. It is thrilling to be essaying the same role". He said when he joined the cast.

Filmography

Producer

Actor

References

Living people
Hindi film producers
Male actors in Hindi cinema
Year of birth missing (living people)